Oakcrest is an unincorporated community in Clark County, Illinois, United States. Oakcrest is located near the southwest border of Marshall.

References

Unincorporated communities in Clark County, Illinois
Unincorporated communities in Illinois